The Diocese of Matelica (Latin: Dioecesis Mathelicensis) was a Roman Catholic diocese located in the town of Matelica in the Province of Macerata in the Italian region of Marche.

History

Camillo Acquacotta conjectures that it was around 578 that the first epoch of the diocese of Matelica came to an end, as a result of the massive destruction of the Lombard invasions.

On 8 July 1785, the diocese of Matelica was revived by Pope Pius VI, its territory was separated from that of the diocese of Fabriano, and it was united aeque principaliter with the Diocese of Fabriano to form the Diocese of Fabriano e Matelica, two dioceses joined by the fact of having one bishop. The Collegiate Church of S. Maria e S. Bartolomeo was erected into a cathedral church, and made immediately subject to the Holy See (Papacy). Its Chapter was appointed to be the cathedral Chapter, consisting of an Archpriest and thirteen Canons, two of whom would fill the offices of Theologus and Penitentiary. The rights of the bishop and diocese of Camerino over the city and territory of Matelica were extinguished. The bishop of Fabriano e Matelica would be expected to live part of the year in Fabriano and part in Matelica.

In a decree of the Second Vatican Council, it was recommended that dioceses be reorganized to take into account modern developments. As part of the project begun on orders from Pope John XXIII, and continued under his successors, to reduce the number of dioceses in Italy and to rationalize their borders in terms of modern population changes and shortages of clergy, the diocese of Matelica was united to the diocese of Fabriano. The change was approved by Pope John Paul II in an audience of 27 September 1986, and by a decree of the Sacred Congregation of Bishops of the Papal Curia on 30 September 1986. Its name was to be Dioecesis Fabrianensis-Mathelicensis. The seat of the diocese was to be in Fabriano. The former cathedral in Matelica was to have the honorary title of co-cathedral, and its chapter was to be the Capitulum Concathedralis. There was to be only one episcopal curia, one seminary, one ecclesiastical tribunal; and all the clergy were to be incardinated in the diocese of Fabriano-Matelica.

Bishops of Matelica
Equitius (attested 487)
Basilius (attested 499)
Florentius (attested 551)

Bishops of Matelica e Fabriano

Nicola Pietro Andrea Zoppetti, O.E.S.A. (1785–1796)
Giovanni Francesco Capelletti (1800–1806)
Domenico Buttaoni (1806–1822)
Pietro Balducci, C.M. (1822–1837)
Francesco Faldi (1837–1858)
Antonio Maria Valenziani (1858–1876)
Leopoldo Angelo Santanchè, O.F.M. Ref. (1876-1883)
Macario Sorini (1883-1893)
Aristide Golfieri (1895-1895)
Luciano Gentilucci (1895-1909)
Pietro Zanolini (1910-1913)
Andrea Cassulo (1914–1921)
Luigi Ermini (1921–1945)
Lucio Crescenzi (1945–1960)
Macario Tinti (1960-1978 Retired) 
Luigi Scuppa (1978-1986) 

The diocese of Matelica was suppressed on 30 September 1986.

See also
Roman Catholic Diocese of Fabriano-Matelica
Catholic Church in Italy

References

Bibliography

Reference works for bishops
 p. 704.

Studies

Lanzoni, Francesco (1927). Le diocesi d'Italia dalle origini al principio del secolo VII (an. 604). Faenza: F. Lega, p. 489. 

Former Roman Catholic dioceses in Italy